Jade Edwards (born 31 March 1990 in Ascot) is a British racing driver who currently competes in the British Touring Car Championship for BTC Racing. She has previously competed in the Renault Clio Cup UK, British GT Championship and Ginetta Junior Championship. She is the daughter of 2000 Renault Clio Cup UK champion Jim Edwards Jr. and granddaughter of Jim Edwards Sr. She is the first 3rd generation BTCC driver.

Complete British Touring Car Championship results 
(key) (Races in bold indicate pole position – 1 point awarded just in first race; races in italics indicate fastest lap – 1 point awarded all races; * signifies that driver led race for at least one lap – 1 point given all races)

References

1991 births
Living people
British Touring Car Championship drivers
British GT Championship drivers
British racing drivers
People from Ascot, Berkshire
Renault UK Clio Cup drivers
Ginetta Junior Championship drivers